Antonio Mikael Rodrigues Brito (born 24 January 2000), known as Mikael Doka or just Doka, is a Brazilian footballer who plays as a right back for São Joseense, on loan from Santos.

Club career
Born in Fortaleza, Ceará, Doka joined Santos' youth setup in August 2010, at the age of ten. He made his senior debut with the B-team on 11 August 2018, playing the last ten minutes of a 1–0 home win against Água Santa, for the year's Copa Paulista.

On 5 October 2018, Doka signed his first professional contract with the club, agreeing to a three-year deal. On 23 September 2021, he further extended his link for two more seasons.

On 20 December 2021, Doka was loaned to FC Cascavel for the ensuing Campeonato Paranaense. He made his professional debut the following 27 January, coming on as a late substitute in a 2–1 home win over União.

Doka scored his first senior goal on 10 February 2022, netting a last-minute winner through a direct free kick in a 2–1 home success over Paraná. On 28 October, his loan was extended for the 2023 season, but was released by the club on 13 January 2023 on a mutual agreement.

On 17 January 2023, Doka was announced at São Joseense.

Career statistics

References

2000 births
Living people
Sportspeople from Fortaleza
Brazilian footballers
Association football defenders
Campeonato Brasileiro Série D players
Campeonato Paranaense players
Santos FC players
FC Cascavel players